Shorewood is a village in Troy Township, Will County, Illinois, United States. The population was 7,686 at the 2000 census, and estimated to be 15,615 as of 2010.

Geography
Shorewood is located at  (41.5181961, -88.2150390).

Demographics

As of the census of 2010, there were 15,610 residents, with 2,146 families residing in the village. The population density was 2,008.9  people per square mile (762.9/km). The racial makeup of the village was 92.71% White, 2.39% African American, 0.27% Native American, 1.33% Asian, 0.01% Pacific Islander, 1.98% from other races, and 1.30% from two or more races. Hispanic or Latino of any race were 4.44% of the population.

There were 2,565 households, out of which 43.5% had children under the age of 18 living with them, 73.2% were married couples living together, 7.3% had a female householder with no husband present, and 16.3% were non-families. 13.5% of all households were made up of individuals, and 3.4% had someone living alone who was 65 years of age or older. The average household size was 3.00 and the average family size was 3.30.

In the village, the population was spread out, with 29.8% under the age of 18, 6.8% from 18 to 24, 30.4% from 25 to 44, 26.8% from 45 to 64, and 6.1% who were 65 years of age or older. The median age was 36 years. For every 100 females, there were 99.7 males. For every 100 females age 18 and over, there were 96.0 males.

The median income for a household in the village was $89,095. Males had a median income of $56,935 versus $42,336 for females. The per capita income for the village was $38,199. About 1.1% of families and 2.0% of the population were below the poverty line, including 0.6% of those under age 18 and none of those age 65 or over.	Median value of owner-occupied housing units, 2006-2010 is $248,100

Culture

Shorewood has one library, Shorewood-Troy Public Library.
Shorewood has a brewery, the Will County Brewing Company.

Notable people

 Tanner Laczynski, professional ice hockey player for the Philadelphia Flyers
 Eric Parker, wide receiver with the San Diego Chargers

References
 

Notes

External links
 

 
Villages in Will County, Illinois
Villages in Illinois
Chicago metropolitan area
Populated places established in 1830
1830 establishments in Illinois